Lachenalia carnosa is a species of geophyte in the genus Lachenalia. It is endemic to the Northern Cape and Western Cape. It is also known by the names Namakwa- persviooltjie (Afrikaans for small purple Namaqua violin) and flesh viooltjie.

Distribution 
Lachenalia carnosa is widespread across Namaqualand, from Steinkopf to the southern Knersvlakte. It is common in central and western Namaqualand, and in the Kamiesberge.

Habitat 
Lachenalia carnosa is found in the Fynbos and Succulent Karoo. It occurs most often in gravelly clay or sandy soil, on granite outcrops.

Conservation status 
Lachenalia carnosa is classified as Least Concern as it is widespread, common and not in danger of extinction.

References

External links 
 
 

Endemic flora of South Africa
Flora of South Africa
Flora of the Cape Provinces
Plants described in 1870
Taxa named by John Gilbert Baker
carnosa